Pierre-François Sinapi (born 24 May 1990) is a French professional footballer who plays as a midfielder.

Career
Sinapi started his career in the youth team at AC Ajaccio, but transferred to Gazélec in the summer of 2010. Sinapi made 16 appearances in two seasons as the side won successive promotions, firstly to the Championnat National in 2011 and then to Ligue 2 for the 2012–13 campaign. He made his professional debut in the 1–2 defeat to Arles-Avignon in the second round of the Coupe de la Ligue on 28 August 2012.

References

Pierre-François Sinapi career statistics at foot-national.com

1990 births
Living people
Sportspeople from Ajaccio
French footballers
Association football midfielders
AC Ajaccio players
Gazélec Ajaccio players
Corsica international footballers
Footballers from Corsica